{{DISPLAYTITLE:C6H11NO4}}
The molecular formula C6H11NO4 may refer to:

 α-Aminoadipic acid
 N-Methyl-L-glutamic acid
 SYM-2081 (4-methyl-L-glutamic acid)